Qazi-ye Pain (also Romanized as Qāẕī-ye Pā’īn; also known as Qāẕī-ye Soflá) is a village in Rahjerd-e Sharqi Rural District, Salafchegan District, Qom County, Qom Province, Iran. At the 2006 census, its population was 90, in 23 families.

References 

Populated places in Qom Province